Aleksandra Radović (born 10 September 1974) is a Serbian singer-songwriter, vocal coach, television judge and voice actress. Born in Bogatić, she graduated from the Music Academy in Novi Sad, majoring in music pedagogy. Radović gained popularity upon her debut album in 2003, which was preceded by the hit-single Kao so u moru (Like Salt in The Sea). Following her second release, Domino, in 2007 she held her first concert in Belgrade's Sava Centar. Her third album, titled Žar Ptica (Bird of Fire), was declared the second best-selling album of the year in Serbia. In 2009, Radović also embarked on her second regional tour and became the first female artist to perform in Sava Centar for two nights in a row. Her fourth, Carstvo (Kingdom), and fifth, Predvorje života (Entrance to Life), albums were released in 2016 and 2020, respectively.

Additionally, Radović also founded her own singing school and has appeared on several televised singing shows as a judge, such as the second series of Prvi glas Srbije in 2012 when all three finalists, Sara Jovanović, Nevena Božović and Mirna Radulović, were mentored by Radović.

In June 2010, she gave birth to daughter named Nina.

Discography 
Studio albums
 Aleksandra Radović (2003)
 Dommino (2006)
 Žar Ptica (2009)
 Carstvo (2016)
 Predvorje života (2020)

Live albums
 Aleksandra Radović Live (2005)

Filmography
Animated films
Alvin and the Chipmunks: Chipwrecked (2011)
Lion King (2012)
Epic (2013)

Television appearances
Prvi glas Srbije 2 (2012)
Pinkove Zvezde 3 (2016/17)
Tvoje lice zvuči poznato 4 (2017)

Accolades

References

External links 
 Official Website
 Aleksandra Radović at My Space
  Aleksandra Radović Fan Page at Facebook

1974 births
Living people
People from Bogatić
21st-century Serbian women singers
Serbian pop singers
Serbian television personalities